The 1988 United States Senate election in Massachusetts was held on November 8, 1988. Incumbent Democratic U.S. Senator Ted Kennedy won re-election to his sixth (his fifth full) term.

General election

Candidates
 Mary Fridley (New Alliance)
 Ted Kennedy, incumbent U.S. Senator since 1962 (Democratic)
 Joe Malone, political activist (Republican)
 Freda Lee Nason (Libertarian)

Results

See also 
  1988 United States Senate elections

External links 

 1988 Congressional Election results

Massachusetts
1988
1988 Massachusetts elections